Zangelan-e Sofla (also Romanized as Zangelān-e Soflá; also known as Zangalān Pā’īn and Zangelān-e Pā'īn) is a village in Hajjilar-e Jonubi Rural District, Hajjilar District, Chaypareh County, West Azerbaijan Province, Iran. At the 2006 census, its population was 734, in 167 families.

References 

Populated places in Chaypareh County